Nordahl Road is a station served by North County Transit District's SPRINTER light rail line. It straddles the city limits of San Marcos and Escondido, California, with its mailing address in Escondido. The station is located between Barham Drive and Auto Park Way/Nordahl Road, both of which intersect East Mission Road. It consists of a single platform and track.

Platforms and tracks

References

External links
SPRINTER Stations

North County Transit District stations
Railway stations in the United States opened in 2008
Escondido, California
2008 establishments in California